The Brexbach (historically: Brachysa) is a river, just under  long, and an orographically left-hand tributary of the Saynbach in the German state of Rhineland-Palatinate.

Course 
The Brexbach is formed by the uniting of the Hinterster Bach and Vorderster Bach in the Grenzhausen municipal forest east of Höhr-Grenzhausen. Many consider the Hinterster Bach simply as the name for the upper reaches of the Brexbach.

From the confluence of its two headstreams by some fish ponds, the Brexbach initially runs along the upper edge of the municipality of Höhr-Grenzhausen. In the upper Brexbach valley there was once a mustard mill (Senfmühle), which burned down in 1914 - a memorial stone marks the spot - and other mills: the Farbmühle, Niesmühle and the Kühnsmühle, none of which are used as mills any longer.

The Brexbach next reaches the village of Grenzau (a district of Höhr-Grenzhausen) and flows through it below Grenzau Castle.  Grenzau station is the terminus for the Brexbach Valley Railway, a line that closed to passenger services in 1989 and goods trains in 1994, but which partly reopened in 2009 as a heritage railway.

Parallel to the historical railway bed runs the  Brexbach Gorge Way (Brexbachschluchtweg including the Wäller-Tour and Saynsteig paths), a very varied and, in places, challenging, hiking trail along steep and thickly wooded hillsides. It reaches the Brexbach Valley Pathfinder Camp (Pfadfindercamp Brexbachtal) in a meadow bottom; for three  kilometres there are camping places, some with refuge huts, and a camp chapel.

The Saynbach discharges into the Rhine in the area of Bendorf harbour.

Tributaries 
 Hinterster Bach (right-hand headstream), 3.2 km
 Vorderster Bach (left-hand headstream), 1.3 km
 Seelbach (right), 2.2 km
 Masselbach (right), 9.5 km
 Felsgraben (right), 0.8 km
 Eisenbach (left), 1.0 km
 Nauorter-Floß (right), 1.6 km

See also 
List of rivers of Rhineland-Palatinate

References

External links 

 Homepage of the Brexbach Valley Pathfinder Camp 
 Homepage of the Brexbach Valley Railway

Rivers of Rhineland-Palatinate
Rivers of the Westerwald
Rivers of Germany